Dangerous Acquaintances is the eighth studio album by English singer Marianne Faithfull. It was released on 1 September 1981 by Island Records. The album was seen by reviewers as a disappointing follow-up to Faithfull's Broken English, as the album trades the angry and controversial alternative new wave arrangements of the previous one for a more mainstream rock texture, using over a dozen session musicians and, for some, giving a certain anonymous feel to the songs. The title is a reference to the Pierre Choderlos de Laclos 1782 novel Les Liaisons dangereuses.

The main singles of the album were "Intrigue", penned by the singer's then-husband, Ben Brierley, and "For Beauty's Sake", written by Faithfull and Steve Winwood.

Background and recording
Marianne Faithfull described the album's recording as a long and arduous process, marked by numerous instances of miscommunication between herself, the instrumentalists, and the producer. She particularly commented that bassist Steve York and drummer Terry Stannard did not gel properly, and that producer Mark Mundy made inappropriate production decisions, such as the inclusion of horns on "Intrigue". She was also unhappy with the way Mundy interacted with the performers: "We went through some amazing scenes. He was treating the band like they couldn't play and didn't know what they were doing - and in a way, me too, but particularly the band. It was a divide and conquer trip. I don't think he meant to do it. He just did it naturally."

Critical reception

In their retrospective review, Allmusic's Richie Unterberger criticized the album for backing down from the musical and lyrical boldness of Broken English in favor of more conventional and accessible material, though he did state that there was "at least one commercially viable track", in "For Beauties Sake" (a Faithfull-Steve Winwood co-write).

Track listing

Personnel
 Marianne Faithfull – vocals
 Barry Reynolds – guitar
 Steve York – bass
 Joe Maverty – guitar
Terry Stannard - drums
with:
Steve Winwood - keyboards 
 Frank Collins – backing vocals
 Denis Haines – keyboards
 Pickford Sykes - keyboards
 Neil Hubbard – guitar
 Martin Drover – trumpet
 Julian Diggle – percussion
 Calvin "Fuzzy" Samuel – bass
Chris Stainton - keyboards
Clifton "Bigga" Morrison - piano
Dyan Spenner - backing vocals
Jim Leverton - bass
Mel Collins - saxophones 
Peter Veitch - keyboards
Technical
Bob Potter - engineer
Ed Thacker - mixing
Paul Henry - art direction
Clive Arrowsmith - photography

Charts

Weekly charts

Year-end charts

Certifications and sales

} 
} 
} 
}

References

External links
 [ Dangerous Acquaintances] at AllMusic
 

1981 albums
Marianne Faithfull albums
Island Records albums